Congregation Adath Jeshurun is a historic synagogue, now serving as a church, at 397 Blue Hill Avenue in the Roxbury neighborhood of Boston, Massachusetts.  As the Jewish community of Roxbury gradually moved away, its congregation dwindled and in 1967 it was sold to Ecclesia Apostolic Church.  It was purchased by its present owner, the First Haitian Baptist Church, in 1978.  The church has restored it to its present condition.

The Romanesque style building was designed in 1906 by Frederick Norcross and David Krokyn and added to the National Register of Historic Places in 1999.

Gallery

See also
National Register of Historic Places listings in southern Boston, Massachusetts

References

Synagogues completed in 1906
Synagogues in Boston
Synagogues on the National Register of Historic Places in Massachusetts
Former synagogues in Massachusetts
Romanesque Revival synagogues
Roxbury, Boston
National Register of Historic Places in Boston
1906 establishments in Massachusetts